Bip (pronounced beep) is a comedy web portal, a production unit and night time TV strip on Israel's Channel 2, owned by Keshet.

History
Founded in 2000, it was included in the channel pack of the Israeli digital system HOT before becoming independent.

In 2009, the channel broadcast Israeli based television shows, and foreign ones such as South Park, Seinfeld, Friends and NewsRadio, but also included Israeli based original television shows, including BeHafra'a ("Disturbance"), an Israeli version of Distraction hosted by Ido Rosenblum, Mahadura Mugbelet ("Limited Edition"), a satire show, Project Bip, a stand-up comedy competition, Crime Animals, crime comedy, and Quicky, a sitcom . Most of its shows were limited for the age 14 and older.
The channel also broadcast several non-comedy foreign shows, such as Buffy the Vampire Slayer, Star Trek and more.

On 31 December 2010 Bip ended its broadcasts on HOT and opened as bip.co.il portal and weekend TV nightly comedy strip.

Original Shows
Bobby and Me
Ahmed and Salim
Layla Be'Kef
Citizen Kopatch
Yalla, Next
Efrat Touring Israel
M.K. 22
Toffee and the Gorrila

Foreign Shows

References

External links 
  

Television channels and stations established in 2000
Television channels and stations disestablished in 2010
Television channels in Israel
Hot (Israel)
Comedy television networks
Defunct television channels in Israel